Condong is a village located in north-eastern New South Wales, Australia, in the Tweed Shire.

Demographics

The median age of the Condong population was 43 years, 6 years above the national median of 37.

88.4% of people living in Condong were born in Australia. The other top responses for country of birth were England 2%, Scotland 1%, India 1%, Spain 1%, New Zealand 1%.

93.3% of people spoke only English at home; the next most common languages were 1.3% Bandjalang, 1% Punjabi, 1% Indonesian, 1% Thai, 1% Spanish.

References 

Suburbs of Tweed Heads, New South Wales